Davide Donati (born 25 April 1994) is an Italian aerobic gymnast. Along with his partner Michela Castoldi, Donati is the 2016 and 2018 Aerobic Gymnastics World Champion and the 2015 European Games silver medalist in the Mixed Pairs category. He was also a member of the silver medalist Italian group at the 2016 World Championships.

References

1994 births
Living people
People from Vimercate
Italian aerobic gymnasts
Male aerobic gymnasts
Medalists at the Aerobic Gymnastics World Championships
Gymnasts at the 2015 European Games
Gymnasts at the 2019 European Games
European Games medalists in gymnastics
European Games gold medalists for Italy
European Games silver medalists for Italy
Sportspeople from the Province of Monza e Brianza